Murdo William Martin (May 17, 1917 – January 2, 1989) was a Canadian politician.

Born in Gould, Quebec, Martin was a firefighter with the town of Timmins when he was elected to the House of Commons for the Co-operative Commonwealth Federation in the 1957 federal election. Martin, a caucus mate of Timiskaming MP Arnold Peters, elected the same year, went on to establish himself as a forceful and effective representative of the working people of the Timmins area.

He was one of only eight CCF MPs elected in the Diefenbaker landslide of 1958, and was re-elected in the general elections of 1962, 1963 and 1965. He sought re-election in 1968 and 1972 but was defeated by the Liberal candidate, Jean Roy.  Martin was an advocate for assistance for the gold mines in the Porcupine camp.  He also spoke against the arcane divorce laws that existed in Canada prior to 1968.

After leaving the House of Commons, Martin went on to serve as a city councillor for Timmins City Council.  He was also a real estate broker and owned an operated the Parkview Motel in Timmins.  He was married to Grace Mills. Martin died in Timmins in 1989.

Electoral record

|-

|Co-operative Commonwealth
|Murdo MARTIN
|align="right"| 6,776   
 
|Liberal
|Joseph J. EVANS
|align="right"|6,290 
 
|Progressive Conservative
|Percy BOYCE
|align="right"| 4,423 
|}

|-

|Co-operative Commonwealth
|Murdo MARTIN
|align="right"| 7,342 
 
|Progressive Conservative
| Émile BRUNETTE  
|align="right"| 6,252   
 
|Liberal
|Joseph J. EVANS
|align="right"| 5,719
|}

|-

|New Democratic Party
|Murdo MARTIN
|align="right"|8,834   
 
|Liberal
|Émile CLÉMENT
|align="right"|5,439 
 
|Progressive Conservative
|Mary GAUTHIER
|align="right"|  4,676 

|}

|-

|New Democratic Party
|Murdo MARTIN
|align="right"|8,452   
 
|Liberal
|Leo DEL VILLANO
|align="right"| 7,592 
 
|Progressive Conservative
|Émile BRUNETTE 
|align="right"| 3,068

|}

|-

|New Democratic Party
|Murdo MARTIN
|align="right"|10,071    
 
|Liberal
|Elmer E. SMITH
|align="right"|  6,456 
 
|Progressive Conservative
|Bob KILLINGBECK
|align="right"| 2,715 
 
|Independent
|John James BUCHAN
|align="right"| 100   
|}

|-
 
|Liberal
|Jean ROY  
|align="right"| 11,141 

|New Democratic Party
|Murdo MARTIN
|align="right"|8,807 
 
|Progressive Conservative
|Wyman BREWER
|align="right"| 2,118   
|}

|-
 
|Liberal
|Jean ROY
|align="right"| 10,804

|New Democratic Party
|Murdo MARTIN
|align="right"|9,819 
 
|Progressive Conservative
|Bill HICKEY
|align="right"|2,997 

|}

External links
 

1917 births
1989 deaths
Co-operative Commonwealth Federation MPs
20th-century Canadian politicians
Members of the House of Commons of Canada from Ontario
New Democratic Party MPs
Timmins city councillors